Traktor Tashkent was an Uzbekistani football club based in Tashkent. They used to play in the top division in Uzbekistani football but were dissolved in 2007.

Achievements
SSR Uzbekistan League: 1
 1986
 SSR Uzbekistan Cup:
 1975

Club problems
In the past, the club was very famous and powerful. But when the club couldn't pay for the Oliy Liga it was relegated to the First Division. They could not pay the players due to an unpopular sponsorship deal. These problems led to the club's demise.

 
Defunct football clubs in Uzbekistan
Football clubs in Tashkent
Association football clubs established in 1968
1968 establishments in Uzbekistan
Association football clubs disestablished in 2007
2007 disestablishments in Uzbekistan